María Muñoz may refer to:
 María Amparo Muñoz y Borbón, 1st Countess of Vista Alegre (1834–1864), 1st Countess of Vista Alegre
 María Muñoz Juan Spanish handballer
 Maria Elizabeth Muñoz, American politician
 María Luisa Muñoz (born 1959), Spanish long-distance runner
 María Alejandra Muñoz, Ecuadorian politician and lawyer
 Maria Sol Muñoz, Ecuadorian lawyer
 María Muñoz (choreographer), Catalan dancer and choreographer
 Maria Elizabeth Muñoz, Chicana activist and third-party candidate for vice president of the United States